Anytime may refer to:

 Anytime (Brian McKnight album), and the title song
 Anytime (Eddy Arnold album), 1956
 Anytime, originally Slim Whitman Sings (1962 album)
 "Anytime" (1921 song), a popular song by Herbert "Happy" Lawson
 "Anytime" (The Jets song), 1988
 "Anytime" (Koda Kumi song), 2008
 "Anytime" (McAuley Schenker Group song), 1989
 "Anytime" (Nu-Birth song), 1997
 "Anytime", by The Box Tops from Cry Like a Baby
 "Anytime", by Cheap Trick from the self-titled album
 "Anytime", by Eve 6, featured in the 2001 film Out Cold
 "Anytime", by Journey from Infinity
 "Anytime", by Kelly Clarkson from Thankful
 "Anytime", by My Morning Jacket from Z
 Anytime algorithm, in artificial intelligence